Neurogenic locus notch homolog protein 3 (Notch 3) is a protein that in humans is encoded by the NOTCH3 gene.

Function 

This gene encodes the third discovered human homologue of the Drosophila melanogaster type I membrane protein notch. In Drosophila, notch interaction with its cell-bound ligands (delta, serrate) establishes an intercellular signalling pathway that plays a key role in neural development. Homologues of the notch-ligands have also been identified in human, but precise interactions between these ligands and the human notch homologues remains to be determined.

Pathology 

Mutations in NOTCH3 have been identified as the underlying cause of cerebral autosomal dominant arteriopathy with subcortical infarcts and leukoencephalopathy (CADASIL). Mutations in NOTCH3 have also been identified in families with Alzheimer's disease. Adult Notch3 knock-out mice show incomplete neuronal maturation in the spinal cord dorsal horn, resulting in permanently increased nociceptive sensitivity.
Mutations in NOTCH3 are associated to lateral meningocele syndrome.

Pharmaceutical target 
Notch3 is being investigated as a target for anti-cancer drugs, as it is overexpressed in several types of cancers. Early clinical trials of Pfizer's PF-06650808, an anti-Notch3 antibody linked to a cytotoxic drug, showed efficacy against solid tumors.

References

Further reading

External links